Xisanqi Subdistrict is a subdistrict inside of Haidian District, Beijing, China. It borders Huilongguan and Huoying Subdistricts to the north, Dongxioakou and Dongsheng Towns to the east, Aoyuncun Subdistrict to the south, and Qinghe Subdistrict to the west. Its population was 157,643 in 2020.

The name Xisanqi referred to the designation of the army stationed here during the Ming dynasty.

History 
In 1952, the subdistrict was still part of Dongjiao District of Beijing, and it was transferred to Haidian District in 1956. It was formally founded as a subdistrict in 2000.

Administrative Divisions 
Xisanqi Subdistrict was composed of 27 communities as of 2020:

See also 
 List of township-level divisions of Beijing

References 

Haidian District
Subdistricts of Beijing